In the 1980–81 season Juventus competed in Serie A, Coppa Italia and UEFA Cup.

Summary 
After a fourteen years of transfers ban from out of Italy, in the 1980 summer, Irish midfielder Liam Brady leaves Arsenal and arrived as bianconero helping Juventus F.C. to finish the season as Serie A champions. They also participated in UEFA Cup being defeated at home in second round.

Squad 

 (captain)

Competitions

Serie A

League table

Matches

Coppa Italia

First round
Group 1

Quarterfinals

Semifinals

UEFA Cup

First round

Second round

References

External links 
 

Juventus F.C. seasons
Juventus
Italian football championship-winning seasons